Steve Rowland may refer to:

Steve Rowland (record producer) (born 1932), American singer, columnist, record producer and actor
Steve Rowland (footballer) (born 1981), Welsh footballer